Rohit Deshpande is an American economist currently the Sebastian S. Kresge Professor of Marketing at Harvard Business School and previously the E. B. Osborn Professor of Marketing at Amos Tuck School, Dartmouth College.

References

Harvard Business School faculty
21st-century American economists
Northwestern University alumni
Living people
University of Pittsburgh alumni
Tuck School of Business faculty
Year of birth missing (living people)